Paul Graham (born March 11, 1951) is a former American basketball coach.  He served as the head men's basketball coach at Washington State University from 1999 to 2003.

Career
From 1992 to 1999, Graham worked for Oklahoma State as an assistant. In March 1999, Washington State University hired Graham, giving him his first head coaching position at the college level. The Cougars struggled while he was their head coach, posting a 31–79 record; the team failed to win 10 games in three of his four seasons. Washington State fired Graham following the 2002–03 season. After his firing, Graham joined Colorado as an assistant, staying there through the 2006–07 season. Graham then took an assistant job at Georgia State under Rod Barnes, and remained there through the 2010–2011 season. In 2011 Graham returned to Dallas, Texas and joined the Skyline High School staff as an assistant coach, and in 2012 as their head coach. During the 2013–14 Season Graham led the Raiders to a share of the 5A Region II District 9 Championship with an 11–3 district record. Graham retired from coaching following the 2021 season.

References

1951 births
Living people
American men's basketball coaches
Basketball coaches from Kansas
College men's basketball head coaches in the United States
Colorado Buffaloes men's basketball coaches
Georgia State Panthers men's basketball coaches
High school basketball coaches in the United States
New Mexico Lobos men's basketball coaches
Oklahoma State Cowboys basketball coaches
SMU Mustangs men's basketball coaches
Sportspeople from Kansas City, Kansas
University of North Texas alumni
Washington State Cougars men's basketball coaches